Falinge Park High School is an 11–16 mixed comprehensive school in Shawclough area of the Metropolitan Borough of Rochdale in Greater Manchester, United Kingdom. The school has been recognised as an Investor in People and has gained the International School Award, as well as Artsmark Gold, Sportsmark Gold and the Healthy Schools status. In 2010 Ofsted inspection it was found to be "a good school where pupils rise to the high expectations of the headteacher and staff".

History
The school was founded as Rochdale Municipal High School for Girls in 1935. In 1953 it became Rochdale Grammar School for Girls, with an intake of 350 and in the 1970s it became a 13- to 18-year-old mixed sex school called Greenhill Upper School. Over the years the schools capacity has increased to 1,200 through a number of additional buildings. 31 August 1988 it was renamed to Falinge Park Upper School as a result of an amalgamation with another school. The school was renamed again to the school's current name, Falinge Park High School 31 August 1990 due to a borough reorganisation and the intake changed to the current 11–16 age range.

Location
The school is located in the Shawclough area of Rochdale, bordering Falinge. It is named after the nearby Falinge Park and is situated just across the road from the park itself. The majority of pupils come from the Shawclough, Falinge and Spotland areas of Rochdale, though some pupils travel from areas such as Syke and Norden. The town centre is approximately 10 minutes walk from the main gate to the school, which makes it ideal for the pupils and staff who have to travel via public transport.

School rebuild
Starting August 2012 the school is being rebuilt with the construction of a new three-storey building on the site, and a refurbishment of the existing sports hall and gym. The existing specialist ICT accommodation and dance studio will be retained. The rebuild project is due to be complete January 2014, the demolition of old buildings began April 2014 and was completed by June 2014.

Pupils moved into the 'New Build' in January 2014.

A new Modern Foreign Languages (MFL) block has been recently added.

Notable former pupils
 Michael Ratu is a professional rugby league player, who plays for Hull Kingston Rovers. He attended the school until 2004.

Greenhill School
 Michelle Holmes, actress who played Sue (blonde hair) in Rita, Sue and Bob Too
 Liz Kershaw, radio presenter on 6 Music, and formerly Radio 1
 Nick Nuttall, executive at the United Nations Framework Convention on Climate Change in Berlin

References

External links
 
 Official Facebook page

1935 establishments in England
Secondary schools in the Metropolitan Borough of Rochdale
Educational institutions established in 1935
Community schools in the Metropolitan Borough of Rochdale
Schools in Rochdale